Peter Kilapa (born 26 May 1970) is a Papua New Guinean weightlifter. He competed in the men's lightweight event at the 1996 Summer Olympics. Kilapa was also placed 12th in the Lightweight (70 kg) Snatch, 11th in the Clean and Jerk and 11th Overall at the 1994 Commonwealth Games.

References

External links
 

1970 births
Living people
Papua New Guinean male weightlifters
Olympic weightlifters of Papua New Guinea
Weightlifters at the 1996 Summer Olympics
Weightlifters at the 1994 Commonwealth Games
Place of birth missing (living people)
Commonwealth Games competitors for Papua New Guinea